SMS Victoria Louise was the lead ship of her class of protected cruisers, built for the German Imperial Navy (Kaiserliche Marine) in the late 1890s. She was laid down at the AG Weser shipyard in 1895, launched in March 1897, and commissioned into the German fleet in February 1899. She was named after Princess Victoria Louise, the daughter of Kaiser Wilhelm II.

Victoria Louise served with the fleet for the first seven years of her career. During this time, she represented Germany during the funeral of Queen Victoria in 1901. In 1906, she was modernized and after 1908, used as a training ship for naval cadets. In 1909, she visited the United States, and at the outbreak of World War I, was mobilized into V Scouting Group. She was attacked unsuccessfully by the British submarine  in October 1914, and at the end of the year she was withdrawn from service. She was used as a minelayer and barracks ship based in Danzig for the rest of the war. Victoria Louise was sold in 1919 and converted into a freighter the following year, though she served in this capacity until 1923, when she was broken up for scrap.

Design

In the early 1890s, elements in the German naval command structure grappled with what type of cruiser ought to be built to fulfill the various needs of the fleet. In the event, the RMA carried the day and three 6,000-ton cruisers were authorized in 1895. They resembled the larger s, designed at the same time, albeit at reduced scale. The new cruisers proved to be unsatisfactory as fleet cruisers, because they were too slow and they lacked sufficient armor protection. They nevertheless provided good service as overseas cruisers and later as training ships.

Her propulsion system consisted of three vertical 4-cylinder triple-expansion steam engines, each driving a single screw propeller, with steam provided by twelve coal-fired Dürr boilers. She had a crew of 31 officers and 446 enlisted men.

The ship was armed with a main battery of two  SK L/40 guns in single gun turrets, one forward and one aft. Victoria Louise also carried a secondary battery of eight  SK L/40 guns. Four were mounted in single turrets amidships and the other four were placed in casemates in the main deck, two abreast the conning tower and the others abreast the mainmast. For defense against torpedo boats, she carried ten  SK L/35 guns. The gun armament was rounded out by ten  Maxim machine cannon. She was also equipped with three  torpedo tubes with eight torpedoes, two launchers were mounted on the broadside and the third was in the bow, all below the waterline.

Her main and secondary battery turrets had 10 cm thick sides and the secondary casemates had the same level of protection. The conning tower had 15 cm thick sides.

Service history

Construction – 1903

Victoria Louise was ordered under the contract name "L" and was laid down at the AG Weser shipyard in Bremen on 9 April 1896. She was launched on 29 March 1897 in the presence of Frederick Augustus II, Grand Duke of Oldenburg, who gave a speech during the ceremony. After completing fitting-out work, she was commissioned into the German navy on 20 February 1899.

Victoria Louise was recommissioned for additional trials on 22 August 1900, now under the command of KzS Hans Meyer. These trials lasted until 21 December, after which further, minor improvements were made. On 28 January 1901, Victoria Louise joined the squadron, commanded by Prince Heinrich, that went to Britain to participate in the funeral of Queen Victoria in 1901. The visit lasted until 7 February. Victoria Louise was assigned to I Battle Squadron on 20 April, where she remained through 28 February 1903. Throughout this period, the ship participated in the annual training routine of squadron and fleet maneuvers. KzS Raimund Winkler served as the ship's captain from April to September 1901. The ship remained in home waters when the rest of the squadron visited Britain in early 1902. In September that year,  (FK—Frigate Captain) Johannes Merten took command of the ship, remaining in that position through the following year.

During the annual fleet maneuvers conducted in autumn 1902, Victoria Louise operated with the light cruiser  and the aviso  as part of I Scouting Group, the main reconnaissance unit of the German fleet. (Rear Admiral) Ludwig Borckenhagen, at that time the deputy commander of I Squadron, used Victoria Louise as his flagship from 23 November to 14 December 1902. On 1 March 1903, Victoria Louise was reassigned to I Scouting Group, along with the armored cruiser . She took part in a cruise into the Atlantic that went as far as Spain, where she visited Vigo. During fleet maneuvers held from 26 to 30 October, the ship served as a stand in for the coastal defense ship , which was at that time undergoing repairs. Victoria Louise then returned to I Scouting Group for a subsequent round of maneuvers held from 30 November to 12 December in the Baltic and North Seas. Following the conclusion of the exercise, she returned to Wilhelmshaven, where she was decommissioned again.

1906–1914
After emerging from the drydock in 1908, Victoria Louise served as a training ship for naval cadets and apprentice seamen. She was recommissioned 2 April, to replace the old screw corvette . She was assigned to the training command, but she remained on the list of warships, not the list of training vessels. FK Franz Mauve took command of the vessel after her return to service. Victoria Louise, now based in Kiel, went on a series of short cruises in the Baltic and North Seas in the weeks following her recommissioning.

Victoria Louise embarked on a major overseas cruise in July 1908; in addition to her crew of trainees, she carried a scientific commission to carry out atmospheric research with high-altitude balloons. While in Madeira, Portugal and Tenerife in the Canary Islands, the commission aboard Victoria Louise carried out the balloon tests between 28 July and 2 August. The scientists disembarked on 5 August and the ship thereafter began a cruise in the Mediterranean Sea. While there in January 1909, she went to Messina, Italy, where she joined her sister ship  to provide assistance to the city after a major earthquake. Victoria Louise then resumed her cruise, which ended with her return to Kiel on 10 March.

The ship began another major cruise overseas in August 1909, passing through the Azores on her way to the United States. She arrived in Newport News on 12 September, where she met Hertha; the light cruisers  and  joined them there on 13 and 22 September, respectively. There, under Mauve's overall command, the squadron participated in the Hudson–Fulton Celebration, which lasted from 26 September to 9 October.  (Grand Admiral) Hans von Koester was Germany's official representative, and he hoisted his flag aboard Victoria Louise for the duration of the ceremonies. Following the conclusion of the event, Victoria Louise departed for a training cruise in the West Indies that ended with her return to Kiel on 10 March 1910. In April, KzS Horst von Hippel took command of the ship.

In mid-1910, Victoria Louise moved to Wilhelmshaven before beginning that year's training cruise on 11 August. That year, she went to the Mediterranean once again, and in September and October, she stopped in Corfu, where her crew was present for the installation of a statue at the Achilleion palace, which Kaiser Wilhelm II had purchased in 1907. The ship returned to Kiel on 7 March 1911, where she briefly went into the shipyard for repairs. She then proceeded to Flensburg to visit the recently opened Mürwik Naval School. There, she embarked another crew of naval cadets for a training cruise in the Baltic, followed by a voyage to Norwegian waters. During a stop in Balestrand, Norway, she was visited by Wilhelm II, who was on his annual Norwegian cruise. From there, Victoria Louise began her overseas training cruise, which included stops in Iceland, North America, and the West Indies. The ship arrived back in Kiel on 4 March 1912, and the following month, KzS Theodor Frey relieved Hippel. In June, she visited Stockholm, Sweden.

Victoria Louise departed for the 1912 training cruise on 10 August; she stopped shortly thereafter in Antwerp, Belgium, where King Albert I visited the ship. From there, she crossed the Atlantic to visit various ports in North America and the West Indies. From 31 October to 8 November, she lay at Veracruz, Mexico, where she protected German nationals in the area during the Mexican Revolution. The ship arrived back in Kiel on 10 March 1913. The last overseas training cruise began on 11 August at Wilhelmshaven and went to the Mediterranean. In December, Victoria Louise stopped in Piraeus, Greece; there King Constantine I and his wife Sophia, Wilhelm II's sister, celebrated Christmas aboard the cruiser. The ship returned to Kiel on 5 March 1914, where FK Hugo Dominik replaced Frey, before embarking on another Baltic cruise that began on 1 June and ended on 27 July in the midst of the July Crisis.

World War I and fate
Following the start of World War I on 28 July 1914, Victoria Louise was mobilized into V Scouting Group, which was tasked with training cadets in the Baltic Sea. After the unit was ready for operations, the ships were assigned to patrol duty on the line between the Dornbusch and Møn, Denmark. The torpedo ran too deep, however, and missed. Shortly thereafter, the naval command decided that the very weak armor protection of the Victoria Louise-class ships precluded further activity, and the unit was disbanded on 28 October. She was then moved to Danzig, where she was disarmed between 1 and 7 November. On the 7th, she was decommissioned.

Victoria Louise was thereafter converted into a minelayer, and was also used as a barracks ship in Danzig. Following Germany's defeat in the war, the Admiralty Chief issued an order on 4 July 1919 striking Victoria Louise from the naval register, effective on 1 October. She was sold to the Norddeutscher Tiefbau company and rebuilt in 1920 into a cargo ship. She was renamed Flora Sommerfeld and operated by Danziger Hoch- und Tiefbau GmbH. She served in this capacity only briefly; she was broken up for scrap in 1923 in Danzig.

Notes

References

Further reading
 

Victoria Louise-class cruisers
Ships built in Bremen (state)
1897 ships
World War I cruisers of Germany